State Route 193 (SR 193) is a two-lane state route in West Tennessee. It runs from SR 205 in Fisherville, through the community of Macon and ends at SR 76 in Williston. In Shelby County, the highway is known as Macon Road.

Route description

SR 193 begins in Shelby County in Fisherville at an intersection with SR 205. It goes east to an interchange with I-269 (exit 11) before leaving Fisherville and crossing into Fayette County. SR 193 continues east to an intersection with SR 196 before passing through rural and mostly wooded areas. It then passes through Macon, where it has a short concurrency with SR 194, before passing through farmland and crossing a Y-intersection with SR 195. SR 193 continues east through farmland to Williston, where it comes to an end at an intersection with SR 76.

Major intersections

References 

193
Transportation in Shelby County, Tennessee
Transportation in Fayette County, Tennessee